The Recommended Records Sampler is a sampler double album by various artists released by English independent record label Recommended Records on LP in 1982. It contains tracks by musicians and groups on the Recommended Records catalogue at the time.

This sampler differed from the traditional record label sampler in that all the pieces here were newly recorded by the artists and, at the time, had never been released elsewhere. (Many of the tracks were later re-released as bonus tracks on the artists' CD reissues of their own albums.) In 1985 Recommended Records launched the RēR Quarterly, a "quarterly" sound-magazine, which continued this approach of releasing previously unreleased work on a compilation album.

A limited edition single-sided EP of the same name was also released in 1982 by Recommended Records and given free to advance subscribers of the double album. It comprised four previously unreleased tracks.

Reception

Writing in a review at AllMusic, William Tilland noted that because of Recommended Records' non-commercial stance and the diverse styles of music on this sampler, listening to it "can be challenging" to the uninitiated. He said its highlights include the pieces by Belgian neo-classical gothic groups Art Zoyd and Univers Zero, and called the Aksak Maboul / Honeymoon Killers track, "a fine example of European chamber rock". He was also pleased at the inclusion of two little-known British bands the Work and This Heat. Tilland named Heiner Goebbels' "Berlin – Kudamm 12 April 1981", which concerns a street riot, "the single most unusual" track in the collection. Tilland did, however, question including single tracks by lo-fi artists R. Stevie Moore and Hector Zazou as he felt it did not give them the exposure they deserved. Overall, Tillard described the sampler as "a valuable historical document" and "a fine introduction to a number of artists". He rated the collection as "highly recommended".

Double-LP track listing

Source: AllMusic, Discogs.

EP track listing

Source: Discogs.

Reissues
In September 2008 Recommended Records released The Recommended Sampler 1982 – 25th Anniversary Edition, a fully remastered (by Bob Drake) reissue of the original double-LP on a double-CD. It coincided with the label's 30th anniversary and included a copy of the very first handwritten Recommended catalogue plus other memorabilia and trivia. The Japanese edition was issued in a replica mini-LP sleeve and included the EP.

References

External links
Recommended Records LP Discography at SquidCo.

1982 compilation albums
1982 EPs
Various artists albums
Sampler albums
Experimental music compilation albums
Recommended Records compilation albums
Record label compilation albums